The American Committee for Cultural Freedom (ACCF) was the U.S. affiliate of the anti-Communist Congress for Cultural Freedom (CCF).

Overview
The ACCF and CCF were organizations that, during the Cold War, sought to encourage intellectuals to be critical of the Soviet Union and Communism, and to combat, according to a writer for The New York Times, "the continuing strength of the Soviet myth among the Western cultural elite. Despite all that had happened - the Moscow show trials, the Nazi-Soviet pact, the assassination of Leon Trotsky, the Russian attack on Finland, the takeovers in Eastern Europe, the mounting evidence of the gulag - Joseph Stalin still retained the loyalty of many writers, artists and scientists who viewed the Soviet Union as a progressive alternative to the 'reactionary,' 'war-mongering' United States." The CCF was funded by the CIA, as well as the ACCF (via the CIA officer James Burnham and front organizations like the National Committee for a Free Europe (NCFE).

Within the American committee,  ex-communist intellectuals affirmed most vehemently the need for resistance to communism: Franz Borkenau (member of the Communist Party of Austria until 1929), Sidney Hook (Communist fellow traveler in the 1920s); Arthur Koestler (member of the Communist Party of Germany from 1931 to 1938) and James Burnham (member of the Fourth International from 1934 to 1940). Koestler and Borkenau fully support the idea of setting up a frontal opposition movement to international communism. Burnham even spoke out in favor of the manufacture of American atomic bombs.

Members
The dominant figure in the organization was Sidney Hook. Its 600-strong membership encompassed leading figures on both the Right and the Left, some of whom included: 

 Roger Baldwin
 Daniel Bell
 James Burnham 
 Alexander Calder
 John Chamberlain
 Whittaker Chambers
 Elliot Cohen
 Robert Gorham Davis (chairman 1953–1954)
 Moshe Decter
 John Dewey
 John Dos Passos
 Max Eastman
 James T. Farrell
 John Kenneth Galbraith
 Clement Greenberg
 Henry Hazlitt
 Sidney Hook
 Karl Jaspers
 Elia Kazan
 Irving Kristol
 Melvin J. Lasky
 Sol Levitas
 Dwight Macdonald
 Reinhold Niebuhr
 Mary McCarthy
 J. Robert Oppenheimer
 William Phillips
 Merlyn Pitzele
 Jackson Pollock
 David Riesman
 Elmer Rice
 James Rorty
 Richard Rovere
 Arthur M. Schlesinger, Jr.
 George Schuyler
 Sol Stein
 Norman Thomas
 Diana Trilling
 James Wechsler

The committee's central or executive committee varied over time.  James Burnham, who worked for the CIA, was a member until he left the group circa 1954.  Whittaker Chambers joined in late 1954 and was also a member of the executive committee.  Diana Trilling became chair person at some point.

See also
 Congress for Cultural Freedom
 Anti-Communism

References

Sources
 Sidney Hook, Out of Step, Harper & Row, 1987.
 A Short History of the New York Intellectuals on PBS's Arguing the World
 American Institute of Physics
 Tamiment Library/Robert F. Wagner Labor Archives
 "Radical History" in The New Criterion (June 2002)
 "Revising the History of Cold War Liberals" in New Politics (Winter 2000)
 "The Mood of Three Generations" in The End of Ideology (2000)
 "Cranky Integrity on the Left" in The New York Times (August 27, 1989)

Central Intelligence Agency domestic surveillance operations
Congress for Cultural Freedom
Political organizations based in the United States